Mike Bajakian is an American football coach who currently serves as the offensive coordinator for Northwestern University. Bajakian previously served as the quarterbacks coach for the Tampa Bay Buccaneers, and as the offensive coordinator at Tennessee, Cincinnati  and Central Michigan  alongside Butch Jones.

Personal life
Bajakian grew up in River Vale, New Jersey and graduated from Bergen Catholic High School with the class of 1992.

He is married to Michelene, and together they have five children: Mary, Anna, Emma, Samuel and Rose.

References

External links
 Northwestern profile

1974 births
Living people
Boston College Eagles football coaches
Central Michigan Chippewas football coaches
Chicago Bears coaches
Cincinnati Bearcats football coaches
Rutgers Scarlet Knights football coaches
Tennessee Volunteers football coaches
High school football coaches in New Jersey
Bergen Catholic High School alumni
Williams College alumni
People from River Vale, New Jersey